The Powerama Motoring Expo was a Western Canadian auto show that was held annually in Edmonton, Alberta, Canada from 1984 until 2010. Powerama attracted contestants from throughout North America.

History 

The Powerama Motoring Expo was named after a historic drag race in Edmonton. From 1956 until 1966, Powerama was the name of an annual drag race that took place during Labour Day long weekend in Edmonton. Eighteen years later in 1984, the Edmonton car show took its name from the city's historic drag race.

Despite the fact that Powerama's advertising was focused on the Edmonton metropolitan region, newspapers from across Canada reported on Powerama including the Calgary Herald, the Montreal Gazette, the Saskatoon Star-Phoenix, the Vancouver Sun, and the Victoria Times-Colonist.

On several occasions, vehicles from the Reynolds-Alberta Museum were brought to Powerama for display.

Notable contestant vehicles 
In 2005, a 1930 Model A Roadster restored by Gerry Kuipers received first prize. In 2006, a 1956 Ford F-100 pickup restored by Lorne Soloview was featured; however, first prize went to a 1955 GMC Pickup restored by Nisbet Patfield. In 2007, a canola biodiesel jet car built by Kevin Therres received attention in the press.

Notes

References

External links 
Official website (archived)

Auto shows in Canada
Recurring events established in 1984
1984 establishments in Canada